Eoophyla munroei is a moth in the family Crambidae. It was described by David John Lawrence Agassiz and Wolfram Mey in 2011. It is found in South Africa.

The wingspan is 18–29 mm. The forewings are dark fuscous with a pale whitish antemedian fascia in the dorsal half of the wing and a brownish-white postmedian fascia. The hindwings are whitish with a dark fuscous subbasal fascia and antemedian fascia.

References

Eoophyla
Moths described in 2011